Aloba Arch is the name of a natural arch located in Chad. Large natural arches are somewhat rare outside the southern and western regions of China and the Colorado Plateau of the southwest United States. Chad's Ennedi Plateau, located within the Sahara Desert in the northeast part of the country near Libya and Sudan has a geology similar to the Colorado Plateau and has produced a number of natural arches and similar landforms, although only Aloba can claim to be on the top ten list of longest arches in the world.

Aloba Arch's span is considered to be the 8th longest known natural arch, and the longest outside of China and Utah. Perhaps more striking than the span, however, is the sheer height of the arch.

References

External links
 Aloba Arch

Natural arches
Landforms of Chad
Rock formations of Africa